Mestegmer is a small town and rural commune in Taourirt Province of the Oriental region of Morocco. At the time of the 2004 census, the commune had a total population of 6378 people living in 1094 households.

References

Populated places in Taourirt Province
Rural communes of Oriental (Morocco)